The Masked Menace is a 1927 American drama film serial directed by Arch Heath and mostly filmed in Berlin, New Hampshire. It was adapted from the story "Still Face" by pulp writer Clarence Budington Kelland and was released in ten chapters. It is now considered to be lost.

Plot 
The mill of an old woman and her ward, Faith Newton (Jean Arthur), is being terrorized by the masked menace of the title known as "Still Face".  The women are helped by a man named Keats Dodd (Larry Kent).  The masked villain's identity is revealed in the final chapter.

Cast
 Larry Kent as Keats Dodd
 Jean Arthur as Faith Newton
 Thomas Holding as Carl Phillips
 Laura Alberta as Grandma Newton
 John F. Hamilton as The Half-Wit named Job
 William Norton Bailey
 Edward Roseman

See also
 List of film serials
 List of film serials by studio

References

External links

1927 films
1927 drama films
1920s adventure drama films
1927 lost films
American silent serial films
American black-and-white films
American adventure drama films
Lost American films
Lost drama films
Pathé Exchange film serials
Films directed by Arch Heath
1920s American films
Silent American drama films
Silent adventure films